Technofeminism explores the role gender plays in technology. It is often examined in conjunction with intersectionality, a term coined by Kimberlé Crenshaw which analyzes the relationships among various identities, such as race, socioeconomic status, sexuality, gender, and more. However, many scholars, such as Lori Beth De Hertogh, Liz Lane, and Jessica Oulette, as well as Angela Haas, have spoken out about the lack of technofeminist scholarship, especially in the context of overarching technological research.

A primary concern of technofeminism is the relationship between historical and societal norms, and technology design and implementation. Technofeminist scholars actively work to illuminate the often unnoticed inequities ingrained in systems and come up with solutions to combat them. They also research how technology can be used for positive ends, especially for marginalized groups.

Judy Wajcman

TechnoFeminism Book

Overview 

TechnoFeminism is a book by academic sociologist Judy Wajcman which reframes the relationship between gender and technologies, and presents a feminist reading of the woman-machine relationship. It is considered a key contributor to the rise of feminist technoscience as a field.

Reception

According to a review in the American Journal of Sociology, Wajcman convincingly argues that "analyses of everything from transit systems to pap smears must include a technofeminist awareness of men's and women's often different positions as designers, manufacturing operatives, salespersons, purchasers, profiteers, and embodied users of such technologies."

In the journal Science, Technology and Human Values, Sally Wyatt notes that the "theoretical insights from feminist technoscience (can and should) be useful for empirical research as well as for political change and action" and that one way of moving towards this is "return to production and work as research sites because so much work in recent years has focused on consumption, identity, and representation."

Editions

Adding to the print edition, which has been reprinted several times, E-book editions of TechnoFeminism were released in 2013. The book has been translated into Spanish as El Tecnofeminismo.

Angela Haas

Scholarship 
Angela Haas focuses on technofeminism as a predecessor of "digital cultural rhetorics research", the focus of her scholarship. The interactions between these two fields have led scholars to analyze the intersectional nature of technology, and how this intersectionality results in tools that do not serve all users.

Haas also explores how marginalized groups interact with digital technologies. Specific areas analyzed include how revealing aspects of one's identity influences their ability to exist online. Although at times digital spaces do not cater to marginalized groups, one example being the idea that someone who identifies as homosexual is perceived as "sexual in every situation", which alters how the online community they are a part of interacts with them.

However, at times, technology can be renewed to serve women and marginalized groups. Haas uses the example of the vibrator to prove this point. While it is now associated with female empowerment, the tool was originally used to control women suffering from "hysteria".

De Hertogh et al.

Scholarship 
Lori Beth De Hertogh, Liz Lane, and Jessica Ouellette expanded upon previous scholars' work, placing it within the specific context of the "Computers and Composition" journal. In their work, the scholars analyzed frequencies of the term "technofeminism/t" and associated words in the "Computers and Composition" journal. Unfortunately, the occurrences were limited, leading the scholars to call for increased use of the term "technofeminism" in scholarly materials and increased intersectional frameworks in mainstream technology literature.

Kerrie Elise Hauman

Scholarship 
Kerrie Hauman explores technofeminist themes in her PhD dissertation, specifically discussing how feminism exists in digital spaces. Using the example of "Feministing", a blog serving those invested in "feminist activism", Hauman applies various rhetorical frameworks (such as invitational rhetoric and rhetorical ecologies) to understand how online platforms can further social justice initiatives in some ways, but promote the exclusion of disadvantaged groups in others.

Melanie Kill

Pedagogy 
Melanie Kill, assistant professor of English at the University of Maryland, College Park, regularly teaches classes at the intersection of technology and identities. One course, entitled "Digital Rhetoric: Technofeminism", uses a variety of projects and class activities to analyze technofeminist themes in scholarly materials, online platforms, and other digital entities. The course also invites students to consider the power dynamics behind technology creation and use, and how these dynamics impact marginalized groups.

See also 
 Digital rhetoric
 Feminist technoscience
Cyberfeminism

References

Further reading 
 Farquharson, Karen "Book review: 'TechnoFeminism', by Judy Wajcman" Australian Journal of Emerging Technologies and Society, Vol. 2, no. 2 (2004), pp. 156–157
 Sarah M. Brown "TechnoFeminism (review)" NWSA Journal Volume 19, Number 3, Fall 2007 pp. 225–227
 

2004 non-fiction books
Books about the Internet
Books about feminism
Women and science